The 1970 Gael Linn Cup, the most important representative competition for elite level participants in the women's team field sport of camogie, was won by Leinster, who defeated Ulster in the final, played at Carrickmacross.

Arrangements
UCD players, Ann Carroll who scored 2–3 and Jo Golden who played brilliantly in goal helped Leinster defeat Munster 3–5 to 1–2 at Gorey. Connacht gave a walkover to Ulster. Kilkenny's Helena O'Neill scored four goals and Dublin's Judy Doyle three and Orla Ni Siochain two as Leinster defeated Ulster by 12–2 to 4–1 in the final.
 Agnes Hourigan wrote in the Irish Press: Leinster's craft, combination and experience proved too much for Ulster and, except for a slow star, and a brief period in the second half, the visitors were always in command.

Final stages

|}

References

External links
 Camogie Association

1970 in camogie
1970
Cam